Metts is a surname. Notable people with the surname include:

Harold Metts (born 1947), American politician
Sandra Metts, American communication scholar 
W. F. Metts (1905–1993), American football coach

See also
Mette